John Fenwick may refer to:

John Fenwick (14th century MP) for Northumberland (UK Parliament constituency)
Sir John Fenwick, 1st Baronet (c. 1570–1658), English landowner
John Fenwick (MP for Morpeth) (d. 1644), English politician and soldier who was killed at the Battle of Marston Moor
John Fenwick (Quaker) (1618–1683), English founder of a Quaker colony in Salem, New Jersey
John Fenwick (Jesuit) (c. 1628–1679), English Jesuit
Sir John Fenwick, 3rd Baronet (c. 1645–1697), English Jacobite conspirator
John Ralph Fenwick (1761–1855), English physician and radical 
John Fenwick Burgoyne Blackett (c. 1821–1856), British politician

Also
John Fenwicke (c. 1593–1670), supported the parliamentary cause during the English Civil War.
John Fenwick Service Area, a service area for travelers using the New Jersey Turnpike